Eresiomera clenchi is a butterfly in the family Lycaenidae. It is found in Cameroon, the Republic of the Congo and Gabon.

References

Butterflies described in 1961
Poritiinae